is a 1965 Japanese film starring Yūzō Kayama. It is the sixth in the Wakadaishō series of films.

The film was inspired by the mid-sixties electric guitar boom created by the popularity of groups such as The Beatles and The Ventures. The sport featured in this film is American football.

Cast
 Yūzō Kayama as Yuichi Tanuma ("Wakadaishō")
 Ichirō Arishima as Kyūtarō, Yuichi's father
 Machiko Naka as Teruko Tanuma, Yuichi's sister
 Choko Iida as Riki, Yuichi's grandmother
 Kunie Tanaka as Shinjiro Ishiyama ("Aodaishō")
 Minoru Takada
 Toshio Kurosawa as Izawa
 Tatsuyoshi Ehara as Eguchi 
 Yuriko Hoshi as Sumiko Hoshida
 Ken Uehara
 Takeshi Terauchi as Takashi

References

External links
 
 Eleki No Wakadaisho (The Young General's Electric Guitar) 1965

Japanese sports comedy films
1965 films
1960s Japanese films
1960s Japanese-language films
American football films